Quiriquina Island, Chile is located at the entrance to the Bay of Concepción, 11 km north of Talcahuano. (Quiriquina is a Mapuche word meaning "many True thrushes").

In April, 1557, Don Garcia de Mendoza, Spanish governor of the Captaincy General of Chile, arrived at Concepción with a large force of infantry and established himself upon Quiriquina. He then used it as a base for his campaign against the Mapuche in the continuing Arauco War.

In 1835, shortly after earthquake in the nearby city of Concepción, Charles Darwin, voyaging around the world on board HMS Beagle, visited the island.

During the First World War the Chilean government used Quiriquina to intern the crew of the German cruiser . Then-lieutenant Wilhelm Canaris, who escaped with two other crew members, was among the internees.

After the 1973 Chilean coup d'état, the Pinochet regime used the island as a concentration camp for political prisoners from Concepción and the Bío Bío Region. This camp was active from 11 September 1973 to April 1975.

On the northwest of the island there is a lighthouse. To the southeast there is Fort Rondizzoni, which consisted of dormitories, mess facilities, latrines, and an infirmary, all for the guards.

See also
 Quiriquina Formation

References

Sources 
 Francisco Solano Asta-Buruaga y Cienfuegos, Diccionario geográfico de la República de Chile, Segunda edición corregida y aumentada, Nueva York, D. Appleton y Compañía. 1899.] page 632
 Sclerorhynchid teeth from the Late Cretaceous of the Quiriquina Formation

Islands of Biobío Region
Imprisonment and detention
Coasts of Biobío Region